Acmaeoderella is a genus of beetles in the family Buprestidae, containing the following species:

 Acmaeoderella adamantina (Reitter, 1890)
 Acmaeoderella adspersula (Illiger, 1803)
 Acmaeoderella alepidota Volkovitsh, 1977
 Acmaeoderella alesi (Obenberger, 1936)
 Acmaeoderella alfierii Théry, 1929
 Acmaeoderella andresi (Théry, 1929)
 Acmaeoderella angorana (Obenberger, 1940)
 Acmaeoderella antoinei (Baudon, 1956)
 Acmaeoderella arabica Cobos, 1963
 Acmaeoderella ballioni (Ganglbauer, 1888)
 Acmaeoderella bolivari (Obenberger, 1934)
 Acmaeoderella brandli Volkovitsh, 1981
 Acmaeoderella candens Volkovitsh, 1977
 Acmaeoderella canescens (Semenov, 1895)
 Acmaeoderella carolusi Volkovitsh, 1989
 Acmaeoderella caspica (Ganglbauer, 1888)
 Acmaeoderella cerastes (Abeille de Perrin, 1900)
 Acmaeoderella chobauti (Théry, 1930)
 Acmaeoderella christophi (Obenberger, 1935)
 Acmaeoderella chrysanthemi (Chevrolat, 1854)
 Acmaeoderella chusistanica (Obenberger, 1934)
 Acmaeoderella cinerea Volkovitsh, 1982
 Acmaeoderella circassica (Reitter, 1890)
 Acmaeoderella coarctata (Lucas, 1846)
 Acmaeoderella coelestina Volkovitsh, 1977
 Acmaeoderella confusissima Cobos, 1966
 Acmaeoderella corsica (Obenberger, 1922)
 Acmaeoderella crucifera (Abeille de Perrin, 1904)
 Acmaeoderella cyanipennis (Lucas, 1846)
 Acmaeoderella cypriota (Obenberger), 940a)
 Acmaeoderella densisquamis (Abeille de Perrin, 1904)
 Acmaeoderella despecta (Baudi di Selve, 1870)
 Acmaeoderella dilatisquamis (Obenberger, 1928)
 Acmaeoderella discoida (Fabricius, 1787)
 Acmaeoderella dlabolai Bílý, 1983
 Acmaeoderella dsungarica (Obenberger, 1918)
 Acmaeoderella dubia (Ballion, 1871)
 Acmaeoderella elbursi (Obenberger, 1924)
 Acmaeoderella elegans (Harold, 1869)
 Acmaeoderella farinosa (Reiche & Saulcy, 1856)
 Acmaeoderella filiformis (Reitter, 1904)
 Acmaeoderella flavofasciata (Piller & Mitterpacher, 1783)
 Acmaeoderella fossulicollis (Escalera, 1914)
 Acmaeoderella fulvinaeva (Reitter, 1890)
 Acmaeoderella gianassoi Curletti & Magnani, 1988
 Acmaeoderella gibbulosa (Ménétriés, 1832)
 Acmaeoderella glasunovi (Semenov, 1895)
 Acmaeoderella hamadanica Volkovitsh, 1983
 Acmaeoderella henoni (Abeille de Perrin, 1893)
 Acmaeoderella holocyanea Volkovitsh, 2006
 Acmaeoderella impunctata (Abeille de Perrin, 1891)
 Acmaeoderella inamoena (Faldermann, 1835)
 Acmaeoderella insueta Volkovitsh, 1977
 Acmaeoderella iranica (Obenberger, 1934)
 Acmaeoderella jezeki Bílý, 1983
 Acmaeoderella jonica (Obenberger, 1934)
 Acmaeoderella judaeorum (Obenberger, 1914)
 Acmaeoderella kubani Volkovitsh, 1987
 Acmaeoderella lanuginosa (Gyllenhal, 1817)
 Acmaeoderella leucotricha (Obenberger, 1940)
 Acmaeoderella levantina (Obenberger, 1934)
 Acmaeoderella longissima (Abeille de Perrin, 1904)
 Acmaeoderella maculipennis (Pic, 1897)
 Acmaeoderella marcaisi (Descarpentries & Mateu, 1967)
 Acmaeoderella mauritanica (Lucas, 1844)
 Acmaeoderella medvedevi Volkovitsh, 2006
 Acmaeoderella mimonti (Boieldieu, 1865)
 Acmaeoderella mongolorum Volkovitsh in Alexeev & Volkovitsh, 1989
 Acmaeoderella moroderi (Reitter, 1906)
 Acmaeoderella muehlei Volkovitsh, 1989
 Acmaeoderella nannorrhopsicola Volkovitsh & Bílý, 1979
 Acmaeoderella nigrentis Volkovitsh, 1979
 Acmaeoderella nivetecta Volkovitsh, 1976
 Acmaeoderella nivifera (Abeille de Perrin, 1894)
 Acmaeoderella normanna Sparacio, 2006
 Acmaeoderella oblonga Volkovitsh, 1977
 Acmaeoderella obscura (Reitter, 1889)
 Acmaeoderella olivacea (Abeille de Perrin, 1904)
 Acmaeoderella opacicollis (Abeille de Perrin, 1900)
 Acmaeoderella oresitropha (Obenberger, 1924)
 Acmaeoderella paradoxa (Escalera, 1914)
 Acmaeoderella pellitula (Reitter, 1890)
 Acmaeoderella perroti (Schaefer, 1950)
 Acmaeoderella personata (Semenov, 1896)
 Acmaeoderella pharao (Obenberger, 1923)
 Acmaeoderella piciella (Obenberger, 1926)
 Acmaeoderella plavilscikovi (Obenberger, 1936)
 Acmaeoderella pseudovirgulata Volkovitsh & Bílý, 1979
 Acmaeoderella refleximargo (Reitter, 1890)
 Acmaeoderella repetekensis (Obenberger, 1934)
 Acmaeoderella richteri Volkovitsh, 1976
 Acmaeoderella rubroornata (Escalera, 1914)
 Acmaeoderella rufomarginata (Lucas, 1846)
 Acmaeoderella safavii Volkovitsh, 1981
 Acmaeoderella samai Magnani, 1995
 Acmaeoderella samosicola Volkovitsh, 1989
 Acmaeoderella sefrensis (Pic, 1895)
 Acmaeoderella semiviolacea (Semenov, 1895)
 Acmaeoderella serricornis (Abeille de Perrin, 1900)
 Acmaeoderella solskyi (Obenberger, 1934)
 Acmaeoderella squamosa (Théry, 1914)
 Acmaeoderella staudingeri (Abeille de Perrin, 1900)
 Acmaeoderella stepaneki (Obenberger, 1940)
 Acmaeoderella strandi (Obenberger, 1918)
 Acmaeoderella stricta (Abeille de Perrin, 1895)
 Acmaeoderella subcyanea (Reitter, 1890)
 Acmaeoderella syrdarjensis (Obenberger, 1934)
 Acmaeoderella theryana (Abeille de Perrin, 1900)
 Acmaeoderella tragacanthae Volkovitsh, 1987
 Acmaeoderella trifoveolata (Lucas, 1846)
 Acmaeoderella trinacriae (Obenberger, 1923)
 Acmaeoderella troniceki (Obenberger, 1935)
 Acmaeoderella turanica (Reitter, 1890)
 Acmaeoderella valentinae Volkovitsh, 1977
 Acmaeoderella vaulogeri (Abeille de Perrin, 1893)
 Acmaeoderella vayssieresi Cobos, 1984
 Acmaeoderella vazquezi Cobos, 1966
 Acmaeoderella vetusta (Ménétriés, 1832)
 Acmaeoderella villosula (Steven, 1830)
 Acmaeoderella virgulata (Illiger, 1803)
 Acmaeoderella volkovitshi Bílý, 1985
 Acmaeoderella zarudniana Volkovitsh, 1977
 Acmaeoderella zeravshanica Volkovitsh, 1987
 Acmaeoderella zygophylli Curletti & Magnani, 1988

References

Buprestidae genera